Marcus West (born November 6, 1983) is an American football coach and former defensive lineman who is the assistant defensive line coach for the Buffalo Bills of the National Football League (NFL). Prior to being hired by the Bills, he was the co-defensive coordinator and defensive line coach at the University of North Carolina at Charlotte. He played for the Indianapolis Colts, Amsterdam Admirals, and Hamilton Tiger-Cats before getting into coaching.

Coaching career 
West began his coaching career at Wartburg College as a defensive line coach before going on to Chattanooga as a defensive line coach. He joined the coaching staff of fellow Chattanooga assistant Will Healy at Austin Peay in 2016 as a co-defensive coordinator and defensive line coach.

Minnesota 
West was added to the coaching staff at Minnesota in 2018 as a defensive line pass rush specialist.

Charlotte 
West joined Healy's inaugural staff at Charlotte in 2019 as his assistant head coach and co-defensive coordinator.

Buffalo Bills 
On February 24, 2022, the Buffalo Bills hired West as their assistant defensive line coach, replacing Jacques Cesaire, who left to become the defensive line coach for the Houston Texans.

Personal life 
West is married to the former Nikki Blassingame, an assistant on the Chattanooga women's basketball staff who he met while coaching there. Nikki is currently an assistant coach at NC State after spending one season at Charlotte.

References

External links 
 
 Charlotte 49ers profile

1983 births
Living people
People from Amory, Mississippi
Players of American football from Mississippi
Coaches of American football from Mississippi
American football defensive ends
American football defensive tackles
Memphis Tigers football players
Indianapolis Colts players
Amsterdam Admirals players
Hamilton Tiger-Cats players
Wartburg Knights football coaches
Austin Peay Governors football coaches
Minnesota Golden Gophers football coaches
Charlotte 49ers football coaches
Buffalo Bills coaches